Vice-Admiral Robert Merrick Fowler (1778 – 25 May 1860) was an officer of the Royal Navy notable for his service as the second-in-command to Matthew Flinders on HMS  Investigator  from 1801 to 1803 and for his involvement in Battle of Pulo Aura in 1804.

Career

Fowler, born 1778 at Horncastle, Lincolnshire, England joined the Royal Navy in May 1793 as a volunteer.  He served as midshipman on Royal William and was promoted to lieutenant in February 1800.

He was posted to HMS Xenophon (later Investigator) as first lieutenant and second-in-command to Flinders during the years 1801–03.  He was subsequently appointed to command HMS Porpoise which was wrecked off what is now Queensland on the homeward voyage during August 1803.  Fowler was exonerated for the responsibility for the shipwreck at court-martial in 1804.

In 1804, Fowler and other survivors of the Porpoise joined a British fleet in Canton commanded by Captain Nathaniel Dance heading for the United Kingdom.  Fowler distinguished himself at the Battle of Pulo Aura in February 1804 where a numerically superior French squadron under the command of Admiral Linois was repelled near Pulau Aur in what is now Malaysia.  As an acknowledgement of his contribution, Fowler received a sword from Lloyd's Patriotic Fund.

Fowler was promoted to commander in 1806 and was on active service in home waters and West Indies Station during the years 1805–11.  He promoted to post-captain in 1811.  Fowler was promoted to rear-admiral in 1846 and vice-admiral on the Retired List in 1858.

Fowler retired to Walliscote House at Whitchurch-on-Thames in Oxfordshire and died in 1860. He was remembered by Flinders in 1802 in the naming of the following geographical places in South Australia: Fowlers Bay and Point Fowler.

Notes

See also

References

Flinders, Matthew (1966) [1814]. A Voyage to Terra Australis : undertaken for the purpose of completing the discovery of that vast country, and prosecuted in the years 1801, 1802, and 1803 in His Majesty's ship the Investigator, and subsequently in the armed vessel Porpoise and Cumberland Schooner; with an account of the shipwreck of the Porpoise, arrival of the Cumberland at Mauritius, and imprisonment of the commander during six years and a half in that island. (Facsimile ed.). Adelaide; Facsimile reprint of: London : G. and W. Nicol, 1814 ed. In two volumes, with an Atlas (3 volumes): Libraries Board of South Australia.  Retrieved 15 February 2014.

1778 births
1860 deaths
People from Horncastle, Lincolnshire
People from South Oxfordshire District
Royal Navy officers
English sailors